Karl Julius Platzmann (born 31 January 1832 in Leipzig; died 6 September 1902 in Leipzig) was a German botanist, draftsman and philologist. His official Author citation was “Platzm.”

Life 
Between 1858 and 1864,  Platzmann lived in Paranagua (Brazil), in order to study the local flora and fauna. His place in the history of linguistics is owed to his passion for collecting words in Latin American languages. He collected books about Native American languages written by missionaries. Later he published facsimiles of these books, beginning in 1874 with a facsimile of the Tupi grammar of 1595 by the Jesuit José de Anchieta. Facsimile editions of historical South American language books followed and eventually included the Carib, Arawak, Tupi-Guaraní, Araucano, Quechua-Aymará and the Mexican Nahuatl (Aztec) languages.

He was elected as a member to the American Philosophical Society in 1886.

Selected bibliography
 Aus Der Bai Von Paranagu. [1872] doi:10.5962/bhl.title.61919 Nabu Press 2010. .
 Glossar feurländischer Sprachen. [1882] Reprint. BiblioBazaar 2008, .
 Wesshalb Ich Neudrucke Der Alten Amerikanischen Grammatiker Veranlasst Habe. [1893] Reprint. Nabu Press 2010, .
 Amerikanisch-Asiatische Etymologien Via Behringstrasse 'From the East to the West. Nabu Press 2010, .
 Der Sprachstoff Der Brasilianischen Grammatik Des Luis Figueira von Julius Platzmann und Luis Figueira. Nabu Press 2010.

References

External links
 Works on Archive.org: 

19th-century German botanists
1832 births
1902 deaths
Linguists
Members of the American Philosophical Society
Scientists from Leipzig